Pâteçassaïé was a brand of fluoride-free, herbal toothpaste produced in Bangui, Central African Republic, from 1923 until the factory's closure in 1966. The toothpaste was notable for being one of the first locally manufactured toothpastes in what was the French colony of Ubangi-Shari, and the formula was loosely based on dentifrice brands in Europe, whilst using a mixture of salt and local herbs.

History 
Pâteçassaïé was conceived as an idea during a health drive to improve dental services in Bangui and rural areas in Ubangi-Shari during the early 1920s. Governor Auguste Lamblin procured funds to stimulate the local economy, and provided bank loans to both natives and residing Frenchman. A co-operative was formed at the Hopital de I'Amitie in central Bangui between local nurses and French Red Cross volunteers, and it was decided that the governor's bank loans should be used to start a toothpaste factory. Once a formula for a toothpaste was conceived, it was decided that local plants such as the Utricularia striatula could be used for their antiseptic properties, and crushed seeds were added to the ingredients.

Pâteçassaïé started production in February 1923, as a "salted orthodontic paste" aimed at the lower end of the market. Incoming Governor Pierre Frangois continued to endorse and subsidise the factory, and even invested his own money into furthering the economic scope of Pâteçassaïé. In 1925, small-scale factories were set up in Berbérati and Kaga-Bandoro, employing 15 people at each franchise, and Pâteçassaïé soon became the best selling toothpaste in Ubangi-Shari.

The toothpaste enterprise reached its peak during the early 1950s, just before Western competitors such as Colgate and Pepsodent entered the market prior to independence. Technological developments in oral hygiene had rendered Pâteçassaïé as a brand using an outdated formula. The use of salt and herbs in toothpastes was considered to be substandard in preventing tooth decay and plaque, and when independence was proclaimed in 1960, government subsidies ceased to exist a year later and the company faced negative growth.

Attempts were made to change the formula of the toothpaste to compete with American and European brands. The use of salt and herbs was dropped in favour of modern ingredients such as triclosan, but this placed a financial strain on the smaller franchises, leading to the Berbérati factory's closing in 1963, with the Kaga-Bandoro branch following suit in 1964.

The sole remaining toothpaste plant in Bangui suffered a small-scale fire in 1965, damaging much of the equipment needed to manufacture the product. The lack of assistance from the David Dacko regime to insure the business had sealed the fate of the Pâteçassaïé toothpaste plant, and the remaining stock of the product was sold throughout 1965 and 1966 until the business folded in December of that year.

Advertising 
Pâteçassaïé was notable in Ubangi-Shari and the Central African Republic for being one of the few local brands to be advertised on Radio Centrafrique, the national radio station. Moreover, large billboards were set up in downtown Bangui to advertise the toothpaste, given that the business received government subsidies. Slogans were marketed, such as: "" ("With salt and herbs, we have white teeth!") and this was widely recognised through Ubangi-Shari. After the removal of salt and herbs following the 1962 formula change after independence, the last advertising slogan was "" ("Pâteçassaïé is the modern toothpaste for Central African citizens!").

Timeline
 1921 Dental health drive in Ubangi-Shari commences.
 1923 Co-operative forms at the Hopital de I'Amitie in Bangui.
 1923 Colonial government invests in formation of the Pâteçassaïé toothpaste factory.
 1925 Branches set up in Berbérati and Kaga-Bandoro.
 1955 Colgate and Pepsodent enter the market in Ubangi-Shari.
 1960 Ubangi-Shari gains independence, becomes the Central African Republic.
 1961 Government removes subsidies for Pâteçassaïé.
 1962 Formula changed in favour of Western medicine.
 1963 Berbérati factory closes.
 1964 Kaga-Bandoro factory closes.
 1965 Fire at Bangui factory, leading to damaged equipment.
 1966 Business folds as remaining stock is sold.

References

Companies of the Central African Republic
Brands of toothpaste
Dentifrices
Dosage forms
Drug delivery devices
Oral hygiene
Bangui